Coalition for Europe (CEU) was a Spanish electoral list in the European Parliament election in 2009 made up from regionalist parties. It was the successor to the 2004 list Galeusca–Peoples of Europe, but in 2009 did not include the Galician Nationalist Bloc. The list won two seats in the 2009 election, obtaining 5.1% of the vote.

Composition

Electoral performance

European Parliament

Defunct political party alliances in Spain
Regionalist parties in Spain